Tom Truscott is an American computer scientist best known for creating Usenet with Jim Ellis, when both were graduate students at Duke University. He is also a member of ACM, IEEE, and Sigma Xi. One of his first endeavors into computers was writing a computer chess program and then later working on a global optimizer for C at Bell Labs. This computer chess program competed in multiple computer chess tournaments such as the Toronto chess tournament in 1977 (2nd place) and the Linz tournament in 1980 (3rd place). Today, Truscott works on tools that analyze software as a software developer for the SAS Institute.

Truscott received the USENIX Lifetime Achievement Award for Usenet.

Further reading

References

External links
The Evolution Of Usenet: The Poor Man's ARPANET Contains excerpts of Invitation to a General Access UNIX* Network, the original USENIX handout describing Usenet
Interview with Tom Truscott
Tom Truscott Biography Contains Full Biography of Tom Truscott

Living people
Year of birth missing (living people)
Duke University alumni
American computer scientists
Usenet people